SMF may refer to:

Organizations
 Sanjukta Mukti Fouj, a military wing of ULFA, Assam
 Sankat Mochan Foundation, an Indian environmentalist organization
 Santa Maria da Feira Municipality, Portugal
 Scottish Miners' Federation, former trade union
 Senckenberg Museum, Frankfurt collections code
 ShadowMachine Films, Los Angeles, California, US
 Smart & Final (New York Stock Exchange ticker symbol), food stores
 Social Market Foundation, Westminster, London, UK
 Société Mathématique de France (Mathematical Society of France)
 Société mycologique de France, (Mycological Society of France)
 Somaly Mam Foundation, for ending sex slavery
 Special Mobile Force of the Mauritius Police Force
 Svenska Musikerförbundet, the Swedish Musicians' Union

Science and technology
 5-Sulfoxymethylfurfural, a metabolite of hydroxymethylfurfural
 Service Management Facility, a component of Solaris
 Simple Machines Forum, a web-based forum software
 Single-mode optical fibre, in fibre-optic communication
 Site Master File, a key pharmaceutical manufacturing operations document
 Standard MIDI File, a music file format
 Synthetic mineral fibre, see Mineral wool
 System Management Facilities, a component of z/OS

Music
 Sick Mother Fakers, a punk hardcore band from Belgrade, Serbia
 Stone Metal Fire, a heavy metal band from Bangkok, Thailand

Other uses
 Sacramento International Airport (IATA airport code), outside Sacramento, California, US
 Sua Majestade Fidelíssima, for His/Her Most Faithful Majesty, the Monarch of Portugal's style